James Coffield Mitchell (March 10, 1786August 7, 1843) was an American politician who represented Tennessee in the United States House of Representatives.

Biography

Mitchell was born in Staunton, Virginia in March 1786 and attended the common schools. He studied law, was admitted to the bar, and practiced law. He moved to Tennessee and settled in Rhea County. From 1813 to 1817, he was the Solicitor General for the second district of Tennessee. He moved to Athens, Tennessee, in 1817.

Career
Mitchell was elected as a Jacksonian to the Nineteenth and Twentieth Congresses. He served from March 4, 1825, to March 4, 1829.  During the Twentieth Congress, he was chairman of the U.S. House Committee on Military Pensions. He was an unsuccessful candidate for re-election. He was judge of the eleventh circuit from 1830 to 1836.

Mitchell then moved to Hinds County, Mississippi, and settled near Jackson around 1837. He was an unsuccessful candidate on the Whig ticket for Governor of Mississippi and for the Mississippi House of Representatives. He engaged in agricultural pursuits as well. He owned slaves.

Death
Mitchell died near Jackson, Mississippi on August 7, 1843, aged 57. The location of his interment is unknown.  He was the author of Mitchell's Justice.

References

External links
 

James Coffield Mitchell entry at The Political Graveyard

1786 births
1843 deaths
Politicians from Staunton, Virginia
Jacksonian members of the United States House of Representatives from Tennessee
Mississippi Whigs
American slave owners
People from Athens, Tennessee
People from Hinds County, Mississippi